The God Delusion is a 2006 book by British evolutionary biologist, ethologist Richard Dawkins, a professorial fellow at New College, Oxford and, at the time of publication, the Charles Simonyi Chair for the Public Understanding of Science at the University of Oxford.

In The God Delusion, Dawkins contends that a supernatural creator, God, almost certainly does not exist, and that belief in a personal god qualifies as a delusion, which he defines as a persistent false belief held in the face of strong contradictory evidence. He is sympathetic to Robert Pirsig's statement in Lila (1991) that "when one person suffers from a delusion it is called insanity. When many people suffer from a delusion it is called religion." With many examples, he explains that one does not need religion to be moral and that the roots of religion and of morality can be explained in non-religious terms.

In early December 2006, it reached number four in the New York Times Hardcover Non-Fiction Best Seller list after nine weeks on the list. More than three million copies were sold.
According to Dawkins in a 2016 interview with Matt Dillahunty, an unauthorised Arabic translation of this book has been downloaded 3 million times in Saudi Arabia. The book has attracted widespread commentary, with many books written in response.

Background
Dawkins has argued against creationist explanations of life in his previous works on evolution. The theme of The Blind Watchmaker, published in 1986, is that evolution can explain the apparent design in nature. In The God Delusion he focuses directly on a wider range of arguments used for and against belief in the existence of a god (or gods).

Dawkins identifies himself repeatedly as an atheist, while also pointing out that, in a sense, he is also agnostic, though "only to the extent that I am agnostic about fairies at the bottom of the garden".

Dawkins had long wanted to write a book openly criticising religion, but his publisher had advised against it. By 2006, his publisher had warmed to the idea. Dawkins attributes this change of mind to "four years of Bush" (who "literally said that God had told him to invade Iraq"). By that time, a number of authors, including Sam Harris and Christopher Hitchens, who together with Dawkins were labelled "The Unholy Trinity" by Robert Weitzel, had already written books openly attacking religion. According to the Amazon.co.uk retailer in August 2007, the book was the best-seller in their sales of books on religion and spirituality, with Hitchens's God is Not Great: How Religion Poisons Everything coming second. This led to a 50% growth in that category over the three years to that date.

Synopsis
Dawkins dedicates the book to Douglas Adams and quotes the novelist: "Isn't it enough to see that a garden is beautiful without having to believe that there are fairies at the bottom of it too?" The book contains ten chapters. The first few chapters make a case that there almost certainly is no God, while the rest discuss religion and morality.

Dawkins writes that The God Delusion contains four "consciousness-raising" messages:
 Atheists can be happy, balanced, moral, and intellectually fulfilled.
 Natural selection and similar scientific theories are superior to a "God hypothesis"—the illusion of intelligent design—in explaining the living world and the cosmos.
 Children should not be labelled by their parents' religion. Terms like "Catholic child" or "Muslim child" should make people cringe.
 Atheists should be proud, not apologetic, because atheism is evidence of a healthy, independent mind.

"God hypothesis"
Chapter one, "A deeply religious non-believer", seeks to clarify the difference between what Dawkins terms "Einsteinian religion" and "supernatural religion". He notes that the former includes quasi-mystical and pantheistic references to God in the work of physicists like Albert Einstein and Stephen Hawking, and describes such pantheism as "sexed up atheism". Dawkins instead takes issue with the theism present in religions like Christianity, Islam, and Hinduism. The proposed existence of this interventionist God, which Dawkins calls the "God Hypothesis", becomes an important theme in the book. He maintains that the existence or non-existence of God is a scientific fact about the universe, which is discoverable in principle if not in practice.

Dawkins summarises the main philosophical arguments on God's existence, singling out the argument from design for longer consideration. Dawkins concludes that evolution by natural selection can explain apparent design in nature.

He writes that one of the greatest challenges to the human intellect has been to explain "how the complex, improbable design in the universe arises", and suggests that there are two competing explanations:
 A hypothesis involving a designer, that is, a complex being to account for the complexity that we see.
 A hypothesis, with supporting theories, that explains how, from simple origins and principles, something more complex can emerge.
This is the basic set-up of his argument against the existence of God, the Ultimate Boeing 747 gambit, where he argues that the first attempt is self-refuting, and the second approach is the way forward.

At the end of chapter 4 ("Why there almost certainly is no God"), Dawkins sums up his argument and states, "The temptation [to attribute the appearance of design to actual design itself] is a false one, because the designer hypothesis immediately raises the larger problem of who designed the designer. The whole problem we started out with was the problem of explaining statistical improbability. It is obviously no solution to postulate something even more improbable". In addition, chapter 4 asserts that the alternative to the designer hypothesis is not chance, but natural selection.

Dawkins does not claim to disprove God with absolute certainty. Instead, he suggests as a general principle that simpler explanations are preferable (see Occam's razor) and that an omniscient or omnipotent God must be extremely complex (Dawkins argues that it is logically impossible for a God to be simultaneously omniscient and omnipotent). As such he argues that the theory of a universe without a God is preferable to the theory of a universe with a God.

Religion and morality
The second half of the book begins by exploring the roots of religion and seeking an explanation for its ubiquity across human cultures. Dawkins advocates the "theory of religion as an accidental by-product – a misfiring of something useful" as for example the mind's employment of intentional stance. Dawkins suggests that the theory of memes, and human susceptibility to religious memes in particular, can explain how religions might spread like "mind viruses" across societies.

He then turns to the subject of morality, maintaining that we do not need religion to be good. Instead, our morality has a Darwinian explanation: altruistic genes, selected through the process of evolution, give people natural empathy. He asks, "would you commit murder, rape or robbery if you knew that no God existed?" He argues that very few people would answer "yes", undermining the claim that religion is needed to make us behave morally. In support of this view, he surveys the history of morality, arguing that there is a moral Zeitgeist that continually evolves in society, generally progressing toward liberalism. As it progresses, this moral consensus influences how religious leaders interpret their holy writings. Thus, Dawkins states, morality does not originate from the Bible, rather our moral progress informs what parts of the Bible Christians accept and what they now dismiss.

Other themes 

The God Delusion is not just a defence of atheism, but also goes on the offensive against religion. Dawkins sees religion as subverting science, fostering fanaticism, encouraging bigotry against homosexuals, and influencing society in other negative ways. Dawkins regards religion as a "divisive force" and as a "label for in-group/out-group enmity and vendetta".

He is most outraged about the teaching of religion in schools, which he considers to be an indoctrination process. He equates the religious teaching of children by parents and teachers in faith schools to a form of mental abuse. Dawkins considers the labels "Muslim child" and "Catholic child" equally misapplied as the descriptions "Marxist child" and "Tory child", as he wonders how a young child can be considered developed enough to have such independent views on the cosmos and humanity's place within it.

The book concludes with the question of whether religion, despite its alleged problems, fills a "much needed gap", giving consolation and inspiration to people who need it. According to Dawkins, these needs are much better filled by non-religious means such as philosophy and science. He suggests that an atheistic worldview is life-affirming in a way that religion, with its unsatisfying "answers" to life's mysteries, could never be. An appendix gives addresses for those "needing support in escaping religion".

Critical reception
The book provoked an immediate response, both positive and negative, and was published with endorsements from scientists, such as Nobel laureate and co-discoverer of the structure of DNA James D. Watson, Harvard psychologist Steven Pinker, as well as the popular writers of fiction and illusionists Penn and Teller. Metacritic reported that the book had a weighted average score of 59 out of 100. The book was nominated for Best Book at the British Book Awards, where Richard Dawkins was named Author of the Year. Nevertheless, the book received mixed reviews from critics, including both religious and atheist commentators. In the London Review of Books, Terry Eagleton accused Richard Dawkins of not doing proper research into the topic of his work, religion, and further agreed with critics who accused Dawkins of committing straw man fallacies against theists (something Dawkins rebuts).

Oxford theologian Alister McGrath (author of The Dawkins Delusion? and Dawkins' God) argues that Dawkins is ignorant of Christian theology, and therefore unable to engage religion and faith intelligently. In reply, Dawkins asks: "Do you have to read up on leprechology before disbelieving in leprechauns?", and—in the paperback edition of The God Delusion—he refers to the American biologist PZ Myers, who has satirised this line of argument as "The Courtier's Reply". Dawkins had an extended debate with McGrath at the 2007 Sunday Times Literary Festival.

Eastern Orthodox theologian David Bentley Hart says that Dawkins "devoted several pages of The God Delusion to a discussion of the 'Five Ways' of Thomas Aquinas but never thought to avail himself of the services of some scholar of ancient and mediaeval thought who might have explained them to him ... As a result, he not only mistook the Five Ways for Thomas's comprehensive statement on why we should believe in God, which they most definitely are not, but ended up completely misrepresenting the logic of every single one of them, and at the most basic levels."

Christian philosopher Keith Ward, in his 2006 book Is Religion Dangerous?, argues against the view of Dawkins and others that religion is socially dangerous.

Ethicist Margaret Somerville suggested that Dawkins "overstates the case against religion", particularly its role in human conflict.

Many of Dawkins' defenders claim that critics generally misunderstand his real point. During a debate on Radio 3 Hong Kong, David Nicholls, writer and president of the Atheist Foundation of Australia, reiterated Dawkins' sentiments that religion is an "unnecessary" aspect of global problems. Dawkins argues that "the existence of God is a scientific hypothesis like any other". He disagrees with Stephen Jay Gould's principle of nonoverlapping magisteria (NOMA). In an interview with the Time magazine, Dawkins said:
I think that Gould's separate compartments was a purely political ploy to win middle-of-the-road religious people to the science camp. But it's a very empty idea. There are plenty of places where religion does not keep off the scientific turf. Any belief in miracles is flat contradictory not just to the facts of science but to the spirit of science.

Astrophysicist Martin Rees has suggested that Dawkins' attack on mainstream religion is unhelpful. Regarding Rees' claim in his book Our Cosmic Habitat that "such questions lie beyond science; however, they are the province of philosophers and theologians", Dawkins asks "what expertise can theologians bring to deep cosmological questions that scientists cannot?" Elsewhere, Dawkins has written that "there's all the difference in the world between a belief that one is prepared to defend by quoting evidence and logic, and a belief that is supported by nothing more than tradition, authority or revelation."

Debate

On 3 October 2007, John Lennox, Professor of Mathematics at the University of Oxford, publicly debated Richard Dawkins at the University of Alabama at Birmingham on Dawkins' views as expressed in The God Delusion, and their validity over and against the Christian faith.
"The God Delusion Debate" marked Dawkins' first visit to the Old South and the first significant discussion on this issue in the "Bible Belt".
The event was sold out, and The Wall Street Journal called it "a revelation: in Alabama, a civil debate over God's existence." Dawkins debated Lennox for the second time at the Oxford University Museum of Natural History in October 2008. The debate was titled "Has Science Buried God?", in which Dawkins used a form of an Eddington concession in saying that, although he would not accept it, a reasonably respectable case could be made for "a deistic god, a sort of god of the physicist, a god of somebody like Paul Davies, who devised the laws of physics, god the mathematician, god who put together the cosmos in the first place and then sat back and watched everything happen" but not for a theistic god. Several days later, in a public debate in Inverness, Scotland, John Lennox used this part of Dawkins' speech out of context claiming that "Dawkins now believes that a good case can be made for deism", which Dawkins refuted in his conference in Atlanta, describing Lennox as insincere.

Reviews and responses

 Alvin Plantinga: The Dawkins Confusion
 Anthony Kenny: Knowledge Belief and Faith
 Thomas Nagel: The Fear of Religion
 Michael Ruse: Chicago Journals Review
 Richard Swinburne: Response to Richard Dawkins
 Alister McGrath and Joanna Collicutt McGrath: The Dawkins Delusion?
 H. Allen Orr: A Mission to Convert
 Terry Eagleton: London Review of Books, Lunging, Flailing, Mispunching
 Antony Flew: The God Delusion Review – Dawkins response
 Murrough O'Brien of The Independent: Our Teapot which art in heaven – Dawkins responds: Do you have to read up on leprechology before disbelieving in them?
 Marilynne Robinson: The God Delusion Review, Harper's Magazine 2006
 Simon Watson: "Richard Dawkins' The God Delusion and Atheist Fundamentalism," in Anthropoetics: The Journal of Generative Anthropology (Spring 2010)
 William Lane Craig: "Dawkins' Delusion", web article excerpted from Contending with Christianity's Critics

Sales 

As of January 2010, the English version of The God Delusion had sold over 2 million copies. , it increased to 3 million copies. It was ranked second on the Amazon.com best-sellers' list in November 2006. It remained on the list for 51 weeks until 30 September 2007. The German version, entitled Der Gotteswahn, had sold over 260,000 copies . The God Delusion has been translated into 35 languages.

Awards 
For The God Delusion, Dawkins was named Author of the Year at the 2007 British Book Awards. The Giordano Bruno Foundation awarded the 2007 Deschner Prize to Dawkins for the "outstanding contribution to strengthen secular, scientific, and humanistic thinking" in his book.

Responding books

Many books have been written in response to The God Delusion. For example:

 Atheist Delusions, by David Bentley Hart
 The Devil's Delusion, by David Berlinski
 Darwin's Angel, by John Cornwell
 God's Undertaker: Has Science Buried God?, by John Lennox (Oxford: Lion, 2009)
 The Dawkins Delusion?, by Alister McGrath and Joanna Collicutt McGrath

Legal repercussions in Turkey
In Turkey, where the book had sold at least 6,000 copies, a prosecutor launched a probe into whether The God Delusion was "an attack on holy values", following a complaint in November 2007. If convicted, the Turkish publisher and translator, Erol Karaaslan, would have faced a prison sentence of inciting religious hatred and insulting religious values. In April 2008, the court acquitted the defendant. In ruling out the need to confiscate copies of the book, the presiding judge stated that banning it "would fundamentally limit the freedom of thought".

Dawkins' website, richarddawkins.net, was banned in Turkey later that year after complaints from Islamic creationist Adnan Oktar (Harun Yahya) for alleged defamation. By July 2011, the ban had been lifted.

Editions

English 

List of editions in English:
  The God Delusion, hardcover edition, Bantam Press, 2006.
 The God Delusion, paperback edition (with new preface by Richard Dawkins), Black Swan, 2007.
 The God Delusion, 10th anniversary edition (with new introduction by Richard Dawkins and afterword by Daniel Dennett), Black Swan, 2016.

Translations 

The book has been officially translated into many different languages, such as Spanish, German, Italian, and Turkish. Dawkins has also promoted unofficial translations of the book in languages such as Arabic and Bengali. There are also Telugu and Tamil translations of the book. The Richard Dawkins Foundation offers free translations in Arabic, Urdu, Farsi, and Indonesian.

Non-exhaustive list of international editions:
  Η περί Θεού αυταπάτη, translated by Maria Giatroudaki, Panagiotis Delivorias, Alekos Mamalis, Nikos Ntaikos, Kostas Simos, Vasilis Sakellariou, 2007.
 (Brazilian Portuguese) Deus, um Delírio, translated by Fernanda Ravagnani, São Paulo: Companhia das Letras, 2007.
 (European Portuguese) A desilusão de Deus, translated by Lígia Rodrigues and Maria João Camilo, Lisbon: Casa das Letras, 2007.
  Illusionen om Gud, translated by Margareta Eklöf, Stockholm: Leopard, 2007.
  Jumalharha, translated by Kimmo Pietiläinen, Helsinki: Terra Cognita, 2007.
  Tanri Yanilgisi, translated by Tnc Bilgin, Kuzey Yayinlari, 2007.
  Iluzija o Bogu, translated by Žarko Vodinelić, Zagreb: Izvori, 2007.
  Der Gotteswahn, translated by Sebastian Vogel, Ullstein Taschenbuch, 2008.
  Pour en finir avec Dieu, translated by Marie-France Desjeux-Lefort, 2008.
  L'illusione di Dio, translated by Laura Serra, Milan: Arnoldo Mondadori Editore, 2008.
  Gud - en vrangforestilling translated by  Finn B. Larsen and Ingrid Sande Larsen, 2007.
  Бог как иллюзия, 2008.
  கடவுள் ஒரு பொய் நம்பிக்கை, translated by G. V. K. Aasaan, Cen̲n̲ai, 2009.
  El espejismo de Dios, translated by Natalia Pérez-Galdós, Madrid: Espasa, 2013.
  Dieva delūzija, translated by Aldis Lauzis, Riga: Jumava, 2014.
  Boží blud, translated by Jana Lenzová, Bratislava: Citadella, 2016.
 Bog kot zabloda, translated by Maja Novak, Ljubljana: Modrijan, 2016.
  Boží blud, translated by Zuzana Gabajová, Prague: Citadella, 2016.

Interviews
 "The flying spaghetti monster", interview with Steve Paulson, Salon.com, 13 October 2006
 "God vs. Science", discussion with Francis Collins, TIME, 13 November 2006
 "The God Delusion", interview with George Stroumboulopoulos, The Hour, 5 May 2007
 "God . . . in other words", interview with Ruth Gledhill, The Times, 10 May 2007
 "Richard Dawkins: An Argument for Atheism", interview with Terry Gross, Fresh Air, 7 March 2008

See also

References

Further reading
Chronological order of publication (oldest first)
 Joan Bakewell: "Judgment Day", The Guardian, 23 September 2006
 Stephen D. Unwin: "Dawkins needs to show some doubt", The Guardian, 29 September 2006
 Crispin Tickell: "Heaven can wait", Financial Times (requires subscription). 30 September 2006
 Paul Riddell: "Did Man really create God?", The Scotsman, 6 October 2006
 Mary Midgley: "review", New Scientist (requires subscription). 7 October 2006
 Troy Jollimore: "Better Living Without God?", San Francisco Chronicle, 15 October 2006
 PZ Myers: "Bad Religion", Seed magazine, 22 October 2006
 Jim Holt: "Beyond belief", The New York Times, 22 October 2006
 Terry Eagleton: "Lunging, Flailing, Mispunching", London Review of Books, Vol.28, No.20,19 October 2006
 Marilynne Robinson: "The God Delusion", Harper's Magazine, November 2006
 Eric W. Lin: "Dawkins Says God Is Not Dead, But He Should Be", The Harvard Crimson, 1 November 2006
 James Wood: "The Celestial Teapot", The New Republic, December 2006
 Michael Fitzpatrick: "The Dawkins delusion", Spiked, 18 December 2006
 Bill Muehlenberg: "A Review of The God Delusion": Part 1, Part 2, on the Australian commentator's CultureWatch blog
 Robert Stewart: "A detailed summary and review of The God Delusion", The Journal of Evolutionary Philosophy. 2006
 H. Allen Orr: "A Mission to Convert", The New York Review of Books, 11 January 2007
 Steven Weinberg: "A deadly certitude", The Times Literary Supplement (requires subscription), 17 January 2007
 Alister McGrath: The Dawkins Delusion, 15 February 2007
 Scott Hahn: Answering the New Atheism: Dismantling Dawkins' Case Against God, Emmaus Road Publishing, 2008.

External links

 Newsnight Book Club – Extracts from The God Delusion
 Richard Dawkins interviewed by Laurie Taylor in New Humanist magazine
 The God Delusion Debate (Dawkins – Lennox) (10/03/2007)
 Free Urdu language translation of The God Delusion
 Richard Dawkins‘ God Delusion (online reading)

2006 non-fiction books
Antitheism
Arguments against the existence of God
Bantam Press books
Books about atheism
Books by Richard Dawkins
Books critical of Christianity
Books critical of Islam
Books critical of Judaism
Books critical of religion
Books with atheism-related themes
Censored books
English-language books
English non-fiction books
New Atheism
Philosophy of religion literature